The United States District Court for the Eastern District of Illinois (in case citations, E.D. Ill.) is a former federal district court for the state of Illinois. The court was established on March 3, 1905, by 33 Stat. 992. The Northern and Southern Districts had been established on February 13, 1855. The statute establishing the Eastern District specified the counties to be included in that District as follows:

Kankakee, Iroquois, Ford, Vermilion, Champaign, Piatt, Moultrie, Douglas, Edgar, Shelby, Coles, Clark, Cumberland, Effingham, Fayette, Marion, Clay, Jasper, Crawford, Lawrence, Richland, Clinton, Saint Clair, Washington, Jefferson, Wayne, Edwards, Wabash, White, Hamilton, Franklin, Perry, Randolph, Monroe, Gallatin, Saline, Williamson, Jackson, Hardin, Pope, Johnson, Union, Alexander, Pulaski, and Massac.

On October 2, 1978, Illinois was reorganized into the Northern, Central, and Southern Districts, with thirteen judgeships authorized for the Northern District, two for the Central District, and two for the Southern District.

Former judges

Chief judges

Succession of seats

See also 
 Courts of Illinois
List of United States federal courthouses in Illinois

References 

Illinois
Illinois law
1905 establishments in Illinois
1979 disestablishments in Illinois
Courts and tribunals established in 1905
Courts and tribunals disestablished in 1979